Julie Katharina Hausmann ( – ) was a Baltic German poet, known for the hymn "So nimm denn meine Hände" ("Lord, Take My Hand and Lead Me"), with a melody by Friedrich Silcher.

Life and work 
Born in Riga the daughter of a teacher, Hausmann worked for a while as a governess. Dut due to her ill health, she lived with and cared for her father, who had gone blind. After his death in 1864, she lived with her sisters in Germany, Southern France and St. Petersburg, Russia.

A legend holds that Hausmann wrote her most famous poem "So nimm denn meine Hände" after journeying to see her fiancé at a mission in Africa and, on arriving, finding that he had just died. Various explorations of her biography have yet to confirm or deny the rumor. She never married. Her poetry was published by others, including  without mentioning her name, at her request.

She died during a summer vacation in Võsu, Estonia.

Works 

 Maiblumen. Lieder einer Stillen im Lande. (May flowers) 2 volumes, 1862 (6th edition around 1880: Front cover Vol. 1)
 Bilder aus dem Leben der Nacht im Lichte des Evangeliums. 1868
 Hausbrot. Schlichte Morgen- und Abend-Andachten. 1899
 Blumen aus Gottes Garten. Lieder und Gedichte. 1902 (posthumous collection)

References

Further reading 
 
 Elisabeth Schneider-Böklen: Hausmann, Julie. In: Komponisten und Liederdichter des Evangelischen Gesangbuchs. Vandenhoeck & Ruprecht, Göttingen 1999, p. 134.

External links 

 

1826 births
1901 deaths
19th-century Lutherans
19th-century poets
Baltic-German people
German women poets
Latvian Lutherans
German Lutheran hymnwriters
Latvian Lutheran hymnwriters
Writers from Riga
19th-century women writers
19th-century German writers
Women hymnwriters
19th-century Estonian writers
19th-century Estonian women writers
19th-century German women writers
19th-century German women musicians